is a railway station on the Ainokaze Toyama Railway Line in the town of Nyūzen, Toyama, Japan, operated by the third-sector railway operator Ainokaze Toyama Railway.

Lines

Station layout 
Nyūzen Station has two opposed ground-level side platforms connected by a footbridge. The station is unattended.

Platforms

History
Nishi-Nyūzen Station was opened on 1 July 1960. From this date, Nishi-Nyūzen Station was transferred to the ownership of the third-sector operating company Ainokaze Toyama Railway.

Adjacent stations

Passenger statistics
In fiscal 2015, the station was used by an average of 229 passengers daily (boarding passengers only).

Surrounding area

See also
 List of railway stations in Japan

References

External links

 

Railway stations in Toyama Prefecture
Railway stations in Japan opened in 1960
Ainokaze Toyama Railway Line
Nyūzen, Toyama